The Yemen women's national football team represents Yemen in international women's association football and is governed by Yemen Football Association (YFA). The team is a FIFA recognized team but has not played any FIFA recognised match so far.

History

Background and development
The national federation was founded in 1962 and became a FIFA affiliate in 1980. The federation had four dedicated staffers for women's football. Representation of women's football on the board is required as part of a wider mandate connected to women's football. , 26% of the federation's budget is dedicated to men's football while only 4% is dedicated to a category for technical development, which includes women's football, refereeing, futsal and sports medicine.

The development of women's football in the Middle East and central Asia dates back only about ten years. In 2005, a women's football programme was set up in the country. In 2006, there were 160 registered female footballers, 110 of whom were adult players and 50 of whom were junior players. This was an increase from 15 in 2005. In 2006, there were 360 football teams in the country, zero of which were open to women. By 2009 there were six senior women's teams and three junior women's teams.

Team
A FIFA recognised senior A team existed in 2006. The team had four training sessions a week. In 2006, the country also had a FIFA-recognised under-18 team who also had four training sessions a week. Neither team played a game between 2002 and 2006. The teams were still around in 2009. In March 2012, the team was not ranked in the world by FIFA.

Results and fixtures

 The following is a list of match results in the last 12 months, as well as any future matches that have been scheduled.
Legend

2022

Coaching staff

Current coaching staff

Manager history

Players

Current squad
The following players have been selected to the squad.

Recent call-ups
The following players have been called up to a Yemen squad in the past 12 months.

Records

*Active players in bold, statistics correct as of 30 September 2021.

Most capped players

Top goalscorers

Competitive record

FIFA Women's World Cup

*Draws include knockout matches decided on penalty kicks.

AFC Women's Asian Cup

*Draws include knockout matches decided on penalty kicks.

Asian Games

*Draws include knockout matches decided on penalty kicks.

WAFF Women's Championship

Arab Women's Cup

References

َArabic women's national association football teams
Asian women's national association football teams
women